Khalilah is a given name. Notable people with the name include:

 Khalilah Ali (born 1950), actress and martial artist
 Khalilah Sabra (born 1967), American Muslim advocate and author
 Aisha Khalilah Steiner or A. L. Steiner (born 1967), American multimedia artist, author and educator